Bai Jie (born 28 March 1972) is a Chinese footballer who made 139 appearances for the China women's national football team and was part their second-place performance at the 1999 FIFA Women's World Cup. Bai initially played left back and was dubbed "Lady Roberto Carlos" for her similar style of play but was later moved into an attacking role on the national team.

Bai Jie was named the first AFC Women's Player of the Year in 2003. That year on 11 June, in a World Cup qualifying game, Bai scored five goals in China's 12–0 win over India. Teammate Sun Wen also tallied five goals.

International goals

References

External links
 "BAI Jie" (FIFA player profile)

1972 births
Living people
Chinese women's footballers
Footballers from Hebei
Washington Freedom players
Expatriate women's soccer players in the United States
Chinese expatriate sportspeople in the United States
FIFA Century Club
Women's association football fullbacks
Asian Games medalists in football
Footballers at the 1998 Asian Games
Footballers at the 2002 Asian Games
Chinese police officers
China women's international footballers
Sportspeople from Zhangjiakou
Asian Games gold medalists for China
Asian Games silver medalists for China
Medalists at the 1998 Asian Games
Medalists at the 2002 Asian Games
1999 FIFA Women's World Cup players
2003 FIFA Women's World Cup players
Women's United Soccer Association players